William Joseph Meyer (August 30, 1943 – April 8, 2018) was an American professional basketball player. He played in the American Basketball Association for the Pittsburgh Pipers. He averaged 3.1 points per game in seven games played.

Meyer died on April 8, 2018 in Martinsburg, West Virginia.

References

1943 births
2018 deaths
American men's basketball players
Guards (basketball)
Hiram Terriers men's basketball players
New York Knicks draft picks
Pittsburgh Pipers players